Clanbrassil Street is a street in Dublin south of the city centre. It runs from Robert Emmet Bridge on the Grand Canal to New Street. It is served by several bus routes. It is divided into Clanbrassil Street Upper (south end) and Clanbrassil Street Lower (north end).

It is named after The 2nd Earl of Clanbrassil, an Ulster-Scots nobleman. Clanbrassil was the name of a Gaelic territory in what is now northern County Armagh.

History

From earliest times the street formed part of the Slíghe Chualann, which ran south from the settlement at Áth Cliath. It took its name from Cualu, the district in which Dublin was situated and which lay between the mouths of the Liffey and the Avoca (in County Wicklow).

In 1868, a new street was opened to connect Harold's Cross with Lower Clanbrassil Street. The Lord Mayor, the Aldermen and Frederick Stokes, who had purchased the land and led the project, attended the opening. The street was to be called Kingsland Street, but that name was never used and it became Upper Clanbrassil Street.

Between 1886 and 1892, 128 houses were built off Clanbrassil St. (on Daniel St. and Harty Place) by the Dublin Artisans Dwelling Company for the industrial and working classes.

Lower Clanbrassil St. was known as part of Little Jerusalem because in the first half of the 20th century it was at the heart of the Jewish community in Ireland. The first Jews fleeing conditions in Lithuania (then part of the Russian Empire) arrived in the early 1870s and eventually settled off Lower Clanbrassil St. In the following decades many of them settled along the South Circular Road, both sides of Leonard's Corner, and in the side-streets off it.

Development of the new road
In 1953 all residents of Clanbrassil St. received a notice from Dublin Corporation that residences on the west side of the street would have to have  removed from the frontage of the properties to make way for a new road. This proposal was constantly changed or deferred, so that in the 1960s and 1970s the street fell into ruin. One by one businesses, public houses and retail outlets closed up or were demolished, and that side of the road became a wasteland.

After protests and demonstrations by locals and sympathisers against the road, and intervention by the Taoiseach, Charles Haughey, work on the road eventually began in 1989. A 4-lane dual carriageway was constructed, flanked by new houses and apartments. The cost of the road was estimated to be £2 million.

Among the features destroyed by the road construction was the crossing known locally as the "Four Corners of Hell" (the junction of Patrick St., Dean St., New St. and Kevin St.), because there was a public house on each corner; and the well-known hostelry The Bunch of Grapes (formerly Fitzpatrick's, constructed in 1739).

Literary allusion
Leopold Bloom, the fictional Jewish character at the heart of the James Joyce novel Ulysses, lived at "52 Clanbrassil Street"; a plaque commemorating this can be found on the wall of 52 Upper Clanbrassil Street.

See also
 Portobello, Dublin

References

External links
 Image of plaque to Leopold Bloom at 52 Upper Clanbrassil Street

Streets in Dublin (city)
History of Dublin (city)